The Central District of Sowme'eh Sara County is a district (bakhsh) in Sowme'eh Sara County, Gilan Province, Iran. At the 2006 census, its population was 75,412, in 21,126 families.  The District has one city: Sowme'eh Sara. The District has three rural districts (dehestan): Kasma Rural District, Taher Gurab Rural District, and Ziabar Rural District.

References 

Sowme'eh Sara County
Districts of Gilan Province